Basking Ridge is an NJ Transit station in Bernards Township, New Jersey along the Gladstone Branch of the Morris and Essex Lines.

History 
The station opened on January 29, 1872. The station building was constructed in 1912 by the Delaware, Lackawanna and Western Railroad, after the previous station depot had burnt down on April 4, 1911. The station agency closed on July 1, 1981.

Station layout
The station has one track and a single low-level side platform. The station has a station building located on the north side of the track. Permitted parking is available at the station.

References

External links 

1872 establishments in New Jersey
Bernards Township, New Jersey
NJ Transit Rail Operations stations
Railway stations in the United States opened in 1872
Former Delaware, Lackawanna and Western Railroad stations